Jocelin Donahue (born November 8, 1981) is an American actress. She played the lead role in Ti West's critically acclaimed horror film The House of the Devil, winning Best Actress at the 2009 LA Screamfest, and young version of Barbara Hershey's character in Insidious: Chapter 2. In 2015 Donahue starred in the crime thriller The Frontier, and appeared in the 2019 film Doctor Sleep.

Early life
Donahue was born and raised in Bristol, Connecticut, and graduated from Bristol Central High School in 1999. After high school, she attended New York University, where she earned a degree in sociology.

Career
After a supporting role in the Western horror film The Burrowers (2008), Donahue was cast as the lead in The House of the Devil in 2009. She went on to play leading roles in The Last Godfather by Korean filmmaker Shim Hyung-rae, and in the independent film Live at the Foxes Den. In 2012 she appeared in The End of Love, and worked with director Terrence Malick on Knight of Cups. In 2016 she appeared in a segment of the anthology horror film Holidays (2016).

As an actress in commercials, she has appeared in numerous national campaigns, including ads for Levi's, Zune, Vitamin Water, Apple, Subway, and Mercedes-Benz.

Filmography

Film

Television

Music Videos

Video Games

Commercials

References

External links
 
 

Living people
1981 births
Female models from Connecticut
American film actresses
New York University alumni
Actresses from Connecticut
People from Bristol, Connecticut
21st-century American women